"Virtual Insanity" is a song by British funk band Jamiroquai, released on 19 August 1996 as the second single from their third studio album, Travelling Without Moving (1996). The song interpolates parts of Jocelyn Brown's post-disco hit "Somebody Else's Guy" (1984), and its award-winning music video was released in September 1996. "Virtual Insanity" was a number-one hit in Iceland and reached number three on the UK Singles Chart. As well as becoming a top-ten hit in Finland, Ireland, and Italy, the song also climbed to number 38 on the Billboard Modern Rock Tracks chart upon the single's release in the United States in 1997. The song also earned the band a Grammy Award for Best Pop Vocal Performance by a Duo or Group.

Composition

The song's lyrics took inspiration from a walk in an underground city in Sapporo, Japan: "everything was covered in snow and there was absolutely no one about. [We took] these stairs that led down to this whole underground city … with all the colour and noise you get in Japanese streets."

Thematically, the lyrics are concerned with issues like overpopulation, human genetic enhancement, eugenics and ecological collapse.

The first B-side of the single is the song "Do U Know Where You're Coming From", in collaboration with M-Beat. It was released as a single earlier in 1996. The second B-side of the single is "Bullet". The song starts with a 3-second percussion intro, and switches into a longer, very claustrophobic introduction. During this part, very faint vocals can be heard in the background, while the melody progresses.

In the beginning of the song, a sound that is sampled from the film Alien appears. It is the sound sequence when the S.O.S. signal appears on the screens of the spaceship Nostromo at the start of the film.

Critical reception
The song received favourable reviews from music critics. Scottish newspaper Aberdeen Press and Journal viewed it as "cool if lyrically trite". Justin Chadwick from Albumism wrote that the "midtempo, piano-driven groove" finds the singer "lamenting the proliferation of technology at the expense of human connection and preservation of our planet", as best evidenced in the chorus with lines such as, "Always seem to, be governed by this love we have / For useless, twisting, our new technology / Oh, now there is no sound—for we all live underground". He added, "While the song itself reflected Jamiroquai's more mature and polished sound at the time, it was the accompanying video unveiled the following month that became the band's transformative, watershed moment." Larry Flick from Billboard described it as "wriggling" and "funk-fortified". A reviewer from Liverpool Echo noted, "If you stop dancing, and listen to the lyrics, you see a whole new side to singer Jay Kay." Music Week rated it four out of five, writing, "From its simple piano opening onwards, this gorgeous, immaculately-recorded track doesn't put a note wrong. Further evidence that Jay Kay is maturing musically." Ted Kessler from NME declared it as a "bittersweet" gem and a "fine" single. Sam Taylor from The Observer remarked its "effortless swank". Aidin Viziri from Salon said the singer "keeps the party alive with unbridled enthusiasm", "exploring the chaos of modern life".

Music video
"Virtual Insanity" is Jamiroquai's best-known music video. It was directed by English filmmaker, director, and screenwriter Jonathan Glazer. At the 1997 MTV Video Music Awards in September 1997, it earned 10 nominations, winning four awards, including "Breakthrough Video" and the "Best Video of the Year". In 2006, it was voted 9th by MTV viewers in a poll on music videos that 'broke the rules.' The single was released in the U.S. in 1997. At the 1997 MTV Video Music Awards, Jamiroquai performed the song, recreating the famous floor moving concept with two moving rooms on wheels, going in different directions, for Jay Kay to dance on.

Content

The video consists mainly of Jamiroquai's singer, Jay Kay, dancing and performing the song in a bright white room with a grey floor. Throughout the video, there are several combinations of couches and easy chair, which are the only pieces of furniture in the room. The video earned recognition from critics for its special effects: the floor appears to move while the rest of the room stays still. At some points, the camera tilts up or down to show the floor or ceiling for a few seconds, and when it returns to the central position, the scene has completely changed. Other scenes show a crow flying across the room, a cockroach on the floor, the couches bleeding, and the other members of Jamiroquai in a corridor being blown away by wind. This became the second video released by Jamiroquai to be successfully done in one complete, albeit composited, shot; "Space Cowboy" was the first. In a short making-of documentary, director Jonathan Glazer describes how the walls move on a stationary grey floor with no detail, to give the illusion that objects on the floor are moving. In several shots, chairs or couches are fixed to the walls so that they appear to be standing still, when in fact they are moving. In other shots, chairs remain stationary on the floor, but the illusion is such that they appear to be moving. In September 2021, a long-awaited remaster of the video in 4K was premiered on YouTube to promote a new vinyl release of Travelling Without Moving. In addition to heavy rotation on MTV and other music television networks, the video for "Virtual Insanity" has amassed more than 227 million views on YouTube as of January 2023.

Accolades

Track listings

 UK CD1 and Australian CD single
 "Virtual Insanity" – 4:04
 "Do You Know Where You're Coming From" (original mix) – 4:59
 "Bullet" – 4:19
 "Virtual Insanity" (album version) – 5:40

 UK CD2
 "Virtual Insanity" – 4:04
 "Space Cowboy" (classic radio) – 4:01
 "Emergency on Planet Earth" (London Rican Mix) – 7:10
 "Do You Know Where You're Coming From" – 4:59

 UK cassette single
 "Virtual Insanity" – 4:04
 "Virtual Insanity" (album version) – 5:40
 "Virtual Insanity" (Unreality Mix) – 3:54

 European CD single
 "Virtual Insanity" – 4:04
 "Do You Know Where You're Coming From" (original mix) – 4:59

Charts

Weekly charts

Year-end charts

Certifications

Release history

In popular culture
The music video for "Virtual Insanity" has been parodied in various music videos and television shows; Austin Mahone and Pitbull took inspiration from it in the video for their 2014 single "Mmm Yeah", and it is one of the many songs parodied in the video for FIDLAR's 2015 single "40oz. on Repeat". Other notable parodies include a flashback from a season-14 Family Guy episode called "Scammed Yankees", which has recently gone viral as an internet meme in 2023 , and a 2021 episode of Robot Chicken. The music video also inspired a video game entitled Jamiroquai Game, wherein the player must avoid the various objects in the scene, akin to the video. A cover remix version of the song created by WaveGroup and DJ TK-ST was featured in the 2006 music video game Beatmania. In 2021, Japanese fashion designer  Junya Watanabe has made collaboration with Jay Kay for collection F/W22.

References

1996 singles
1996 songs
Jamiroquai songs
MTV Video of the Year Award
Music videos directed by Jonathan Glazer
Number-one singles in Iceland
Songs written by Jason Kay
Songs written by Toby Smith
S2 Records singles